This is a list of all significant characters from the TV series M.I. High, a BBC children's spy-fi adventure series shown primarily on the CBBC channel.

M.I. High Agents

First Team

The first M.I. High team consisted of Daisy Millar (Bel Powley), Blane Whittaker (Moustafa Palazli), Rose Gupta (Rachel Petladwala) and their handler, Lenny Bicknall (Danny John-Jules). The team were based out of the M.I.9 base at St. Hope's School. Daisy, Blane and Lenny left between series two and three. Daisy and Blane left to train new child agents as part of Unit Alpha. It is not explained why Lenny left the team.

Daisy Millar 
Daisy Millar (Bel Powley) was one of the three original agents in M.I. High alongside Blane and Rose. Daisy is the team's master of disguise, frequently being sent off on reconnaissance missions. In many episodes she dresses up and goes undercover. She is also considered by Lenny to have superior social skills. Daisy is an only child. Her parents both work abroad. In "The Power Thief", it is revealed that her father is the chairman of the Serinturk Museum's board of trustees. She has met The Queen because of her father's position and lives in a big country estate, although she tells no one at school about her family or where she lives, only Blane finds out the truth in "The Power Thief". She mentions that she was sent to St Hope's because her parents thought it would be character building. In "Asteroid Attack" she briefly reunites with her father, who is mentioned to be an absent figure in her life. Bel Powley's real father, Mark Powley, plays her in-show father in the episode. She is a fan of the boy band "Crush". She has a crush on Blane but hasn't told him, though when asked by him in the episode "Spy Animals" whether she fancied him or not while she was under the influence of truth serum, she nearly confesses her feelings. In the episode "Spy Plane" she is shown to be jealous of Irena when Blane shows an interest in her. Daisy is very girly. She frequently squabbles with Rose because of their clashing personalities. In "Art Attack" it is mentioned that both she and Blane have left the school to go off and help train new child agents for M.I.9 as part of Unit Alpha.

Blane Whittaker
Blane Whittaker (Moustafa Palazli) was one of the three original agents in M.I. High along with Daisy and Rose. Blane is the team's hot-headed martial arts expert. He is also a karate black belt champion, and holds the UK long jump record. Blane has been best friends with Stewart since the age of six, but after joining M.I.9, he hasn't been able to spend as much time with Stewart as he's wanted to. It was mentioned in "Nerd Alert" that Blane has an older brother, called Kyle, who's in the military. In "The Power Thief" Blane mentions that he lives in a council estate. Blane's hobbies include watching martial arts films and playing video games. He is shown to have a crush on Daisy, being jealous of Chad Turner when Daisy shows an interest in him. In "Art Attack" it is mentioned that both she and Blane have left the school to go off and help train new child agents for M.I.9 as part of Unit Alpha.

Rose Gupta
Rose Gupta (Rachel Petladwala) is the team's scientific, technical and analytical expert and has a high IQ, winning various competitions and producing miscellaneous inventions throughout the series. She is one of the original agents in M.I. High. At school, Rose is presented as the stereotypical 'nerd' with big glasses, either with her hair tied up or tied back. She is usually always shown carrying several books. At times she can get frustrated over stupidity, clumsiness or not knowing something. She often clashes with Daisy because of their differing personalities and interests. When Daisy and Blane leave for Unit Alpha, Rose is shown to be more confident in herself and is being recognised by the class. Rose also develops more skills in her physical techniques as time goes by.

She is the eldest of three siblings and her parents own the local DVD rental store. She hinted that she may have a small crush on Blane's best friend, Stewart in "The Worm" and is annoyed that Stewart prefers Daisy over her. In a later episode it is shown that the Worm himself has a big crush on Rose. In the episode 'Eyes on Their Stars', Rose is shown to play the tuba, although she switches to clarinet at the end of the episode. She also has a hidden talent for singing, shown when she sang the antidote song with Crush. In season 3 she temporarily joins a school for exceedingly intelligent children, but returns to Saint Hope's when its true purpose is revealed. In the episodes "The B Team" and "The New Grand Master", Rose develops a crush on Scoop, and at the end of the former she states "The real Scoop is brave, thoughtful and kind, and the only thing holding him back is himself." In "The Gran Master", it is revealed that Scoop still likes Rose in spite of not knowing that she's a spy, and each wants to go to the school disco with the her.

Lenny Bicknall
Lenny Bicknall (Danny John-Jules) was an M.I.9 agent deep undercover posing as Saint Hope's School's caretaker. He has an old war wound on his hip which causes him to walk with a limp. He has been with M.I.9 for many years and has been involved in several espionage missions. His storeroom is the secret entrance to the M.I. High base under the school, and he has his own personal spy gadgets including a signalling device concealed within the handle of his broom, which he uses when in caretaker guise contact agents under his care. He doesn't get on well with the school's headmaster, Mr. Flatley because Lenny spends more time with the agents than he does fixing things. Lenny cares greatly for the agents under his care. Lenny has been known to get very nostalgic often monologuing about his days as a young agent. He is also shown to be romantically interested in Ms. Templeman. Lenny moves on as the young agents' handler at the end of series 2, and is replaced by Frank, the former head of training at M.I.9.

Second Team
Rachel Petladwala returns as Rose Gupta for Series 3, 4 and 5. With Daisy, Blane and Lenny all having moved on from the M.I High Project, Rose is now accompanied by new teammates Oscar Cole (Ben Kerfoot) and Carrie Stewart (Charlene Osuagwu), as well as team handler and mentor Frank London (Jonny Freeman).

Oscar Cole
Oscar Cole (Ben Kerfoot) is the team's cover, 'social chameleon' and infiltration expert, speaking over 14 different languages. Oscar's mother, Jade Dixon-Halliday, betrayed M.I.9 for S.K.U.L. She appears to be a double agent, switching sides continuously to gain the advantage. Oscar seems very insecure about his mum, not wanting anybody to find out what she is like. He finds out his real name is Oscar Dixon-Halliday which is double-barrelled after both his parents. His name was changed to Oscar Cole by M.I.9 who wanted to protect his identity after his mother left to join S.K.U.L. In "Return of the Mummy", she is believed to be on S.K.U.L.'s side. Oscar's father, Edward Dixon-Halliday, went missing in action in a mission that he took up in Africa when Oscar was 4 and Oscar believed that he had died. However, as revealed in "The Lost Hero", is alive and was working as a mole in S.K.U.L. after taking 9 years to escape from Africa. It is also revealed that Oscar did not live with foster parents but instead an M.I.9 agent, who tried bonding with him but failed. Before it was revealed that Oscar's father was alive he was very close to Frank, much closer than Rose or Carrie. This is especially shown in "Operation Flopsy" when Oscar turned to Frank alone about S.K.U.L and his mother.

Carrie Stewart
Carrie Stewart (Charlene Osuagwu) is the team's martial arts expert. A keen gymnast, who has ambitions to become a professional gymnast, she is a member of the British gymnastics team as shown in "The Visit". "Agent X" tells us that her mum encourages this idea, and she gets Carrie to keep an internet blog, so that when she is famous, her fans can keep track of her. In the episode "Run Carrie Run" her hope saves the world from the Grand Master's despair bomb. She is an experienced and highly skilled martial artist, proficient in Karate, Jim-Do, and judo. She is quite capable of fighting far more experienced individuals, including Ivan Awfulcold, Well Fit Jim, Anita Blackwell and even the extremely skilled and experienced Jade Dixon-Halliday. She is also enthusiastic with physical fitness and extremely athletic. She is a strong-willed, independent and very capable M.I.9 Agent. Carrie has an alarmingly low tolerance of panic, stress and annoyance, shown in "The Patient" when she suffers from traumatic panic attacks, undergoes stress disorders in "The First to Crack", but she puts aside these personal issues to complete the mission.

Frank London
Frank London (Jonny Freeman) is the handler of the current team and of Rose's second team. He was head of part of training that Rose was taking between series two and three. As the team's handler, he has taken over Lenny's position as mentor, and as St Hopes' caretaker. He gets on much better with Mr. Flatley than Lenny did, but, Frank is still quite new and is shown to have very little experience in hand-to-hand combat, As shown in "The Patient" when faced with a Ninja he performed some questionable Kung-Fu moves before she took him down easily. He generally quite lovable and cares about the agents under his care a lot. He has now moved on from Saint Hopes to Bleakwood Academy, renamed Saint Hearts. He reprises the role in series 6 and 7.

Third Team

Aneisha Jones
Aneisha Jones (Oyiza Momoh) is the master of disguise in the group, and was originally spotted by M.I.9 for changing identities, though this was only noticed by them, and no one else. According to Stella, Aneisha was spotted with the President of the United States and the Foreign Secretary, and intelligence suggested that she had a front-row seat at the 2011 Royal Wedding. Her excuse was that she needed big names for her petition of human rights. She is also Mrs King's niece, which causes a few issues when Mrs King returns as deputy head in series 7.

She trusts her instincts to tell her what's right and wrong; successfully identifying Jenny Lane as the Crime Minister and trusting Zoe from the start. Although she has some basic martial skills, Aniesha is not at such a standard as Zoe and Dan, causing her to feel left out when the three go on field work.

She is seen as a counterpart for Daisy as both are masters of disguise.

Dan Morgan
Daniel 'Dan' Morgan (Sam Strike) is an expert at martial arts, parkour, and is a field agent alongside Zoe and Aneisha. It is implied throughout most of the series that he fancies Zoe who in return has mutual feelings. Dan is unofficially nicknamed "Mr. Practical" due to his sceptical view towards fantastical theories (as seen in "The Dark Wizard") and often has an "old-school" approach to his spywork. He was recruited by M.I.9 after being seen performing parkour when chasing after some thieves who stole an old lady's handbag. He and Zoe often go on action missions together both being trained in fighting.

He is very suspicious of people and careful with who he trusts. When Zoe first joined the team, Dan made it very obvious he did not trust her, but when she defended the team from a laser beam sent by the Grand Master, the bond of trust was formed. It is obvious that Zoe and Dan like each other as they frequently back each other up in what the other is saying and care for the other and it would be amazing if they admit this. Zoe often gets called Dan's girlfriend and they often get called 'Romeo and Juliet' throughout the series. They share a romantic hug in 'The Dark Wizard'. Dan gets on well with his mentor Frank, each trusting the other to do the right thing. Dan shows in Episode 1/2 that he believes Frank is innocent, and goes out to prove this, showing that he trusts the older mentor.

Tom Tupper
Tom Tupper (Oscar Jacques) is the team's technical genius, often creating gadgets to help out the team and hacking into various mainframes to stop KORPS. He was spotted when he hacked into NASA and reprogrammed the Mars rover to write his name on the face of Mars. Often calling himself the boy genius, Tom seems to have a very sarcastic sense of humour.

Tom is seen as a counterpart for Rose as both are intelligent, normally stay in their bases and feel the need to prove themselves to their team.

Zoe
Zoe  (Natasha Watson) - originally named V.9.5.Z.0.E.6, or V:9:5 for short - is an all-rounder, but mainly serves as martial arts expert alongside Dan. She works well with Dan and Aniesha and all are friends. She has feelings for Daniel Morgan and she's good friends with both Tom and Aneisha. In episode 12 it is revealed that Zoe is a clone of The Mastermind, apparently the only successful one out of over 80 others; she also meets another failed clone of The Mastermind, B:9:2:K:L:0:E:7 (Kloe). In episode 13, KORPS attempted to place The Mastermind's consciousness into her body, but ultimately failed. In episode 1 of series seven, it is revealed that she wasn't a successful clone after all and has temporarily left M.I. High to travel the world and find her 'sisters' (the other clones).

Keri Summers
Keri Summers (Julia Brown) is a clone of The Mastermind originally named J:4:5:K:3:R:1, and is effectively Zoe's 'sister'. She becomes an agent in episode 1 of series seven and is Zoe's replacement. She is a fast learner and can learn a martial arts move by simply watching the others. She can be very dumb at moments, but usually ends up helping out. She often annoys Dan, as he feels that she doesn't take anything seriously. However, they begin to get along better through the series. It is revealed in episode 1 of series seven that she received special treatment by KORPS that makes her ideal as a host of The Mastermind's consciousness, but KORPS threw her out, believing that it was unsuccessful. She, along with another clone, J:6:3:L:1:B:1 (Libi) received the treatment. Libi was found working for KORPS as a scientist, not knowing about her true purpose. She was later placed with a foster family by M.I.9 in episode 1 of series seven. Her ability strengthens the team more as they know she has their back most of the time.

Primary Antagonists

KORPS

The Mastermind
The Mastermind (voiced by Brian Cox (Series 6), Gavin Mitchell (Series 7)) is the dictatorial head of KORPS. His consciousness was uploaded into a computer in order to cheat death and various clones using his DNA were created in order to house his consciousness. He only ever appears onscreen as a digital interface in KORPS HQ, or in his neuron containment case. He, his deputy The Crime Minister, and KORPS were thought to have been defeated over ten years ago by M.I.9, but they survived and rose again in Series 6. The Grand Master was once a KORPS captain, but sold them out to M.I.9 so that he could run away and assume control of S.K.U.L., an old KORPS division. KORPS attempted to upload his consciousness into one of his clones, Zoe, thinking that she was a successful clone, but failed as she was not a match. He now seeks clones Keri and Libi in order to create two copies of himself, rendering KORPS unbeatable.

The Crime Minister
The Crime Minister (Pollyanna McIntosh) is the cruel Deputy Head of KORPS. She is incredibly loyal to The Mastermind and was presumed dead after the end of the first war with KORPS. She is generally seen in command of KORPS due to The Mastermind's condition.

S.K.U.L

The Grand Master
The Grand Master (voiced by Kerry Shale (Series 1), played and voiced by Julian Bleach (Series 2-6)) is the Head of S.K.U.L., the Super Kriminal Underworld League. He owns a white rabbit which he refers to as General Flopsy. The Grand Master's face is never seen on-screen; his features are always concealed in shadows, or covered with sunglasses, a hat and a scarf. In the first episode of Series 6, S.K.U.L. falls after an assault on numerous S.K.U.L. bases and The Grand Master's capture by M.I.9. He now resides in an M.I.9 prison with Flopsy living at Saint Heart's HQ.

The Grand Mistress
The Grand Mistress (Super Villain, Series 4-5, second M.I. High game), played by Tracy Ann Oberman. In Series 4 Episode 2, she took control of S.K.U.L. with the help of animatronic animals. Though defeated in the episode, she became the main villain in the second M.I. High game and returned in Series 5 Episode 2.

S.K.U.L. Agents
The Guinea Pig (Moya Brady), real name Professor Sally Moreau, is renowned for her discredited experiments. Self-experimentation has caused her to mutate into a half-human, half-guinea pig hybrid. She works for the Grand Master and is sponsored by S.K.U.L. She tried to take over the world using a cyber clone of the Prime Minister until the M.I. High spies discovered her plans.

Sonya Frost (Siobhan Hewlett) is a secretary for the Weather Bureau. She is also a former weather girl, she was sacked from this job after one of her predictions was dramatically out of proportion. Her 'secretary' post was actually a cover; she had invented a weather machine that Roger Powel was going to present as his own. Little knowing, Sonya had sold her idea to The Grand Master and S.K.U.L. She studied physics at Oxford University.

Chad Turner (Toby Regbo) is an arrogant CIA agent. He was a popular kid at Saint Hope's. He was working for the Grand Master in an attempt to sell the MT3000 for a high price. He made Blane jealous because he was a better football player and Daisy liked Chad, yet Blane has a crush on Daisy. Fortunately he was later arrested by M.I.9.

Silas Fenton (Jeremy Swift) is an hapless who seriously wants to be in S.K.U.L., even though the Grand Master has serious doubts about this! He used several animals, including the Grand Master's own General Flopsy, to spy on the Saint Hope's staff. He used truth darts and spy cams. He attempted to suck out Daisy's brain using flies. His brain was sucked out, leaving him a completely mindless fool. He was then asked to become a member of S.K.U.L. to take part in the annual Big Six meeting but was put in prison when M.I.9 raided the meeting.

Vanessa Zietgeist (Rula Lenska) is a beautician working for the Grand Master (or as she calls him, "G.M."). She is around 60. She was on a quest to stay young, having won a beauty pageant at six years old but ended up on the beauty scrapheap at twenty-one. She contaminated the drinking water at science laboratory N.O.S.E. with a regression formula which gave top scientists the mental age of toddlers; the whole of Saint Hope's (both teachers and students) were also regressed when a sample of the formula was poured into the custard being prepared for school lunch by the affected Dr. Grabworst. At the end of the episode, she accepted her true age and betrayed The Grand Master.

Agent Zero (Mark Bagnell) is the brainless and rather boring nephew of The Grand Master. Unlike his devious and evil "Grand Uncle", Agent Zero has no interest in taking over the world and/or working for S.K.U.L.; he'd rather tuck into a delicious Pot Noodle or some tasty sandwiches instead.

Leah Retsam (The Grand Master's Grandchild, Series 2 Episode 1 "It's a Kind of Magic"), played by Holliday Grainger. Leah worked undercover as a clumsy assistant for famous magician David Dehaveland. She kidnapped the President of the United States in order to exchange her for The Grand Master who had recently been captured by M.I.9.

Lorenzo Ferrago (S.K.U.L. Associate and Fashion Designer, Series 2 Episode 3 "Evil by Design" and Series 3 Episode 7 "The New Grand Master"). Ferrago is a failing fashion designer who has no talent. Claiming to be Italian, he is in fact from a small Welsh mining village near Abergavenny. He relied heavily on Evie Solomon, a much more talented fashion designer to design his range of 'common' clothing. When he lost sales, he began to work for S.K.U.L. by testing an experimental chemical that made people buy more of his clothes with all proceeded going to S.K.U.L. He was arrested by M.I.9 and put in prison. He was later released with a wiped memory when M.I.9 discovered that he'd been invited to become a member of S.K.U.L.'s Big Six. He was later rearrested and put back in prison when M.I.9 raided the meeting.

Maximus Fiticus (S.K.U.L. Associate and Former Olympian, Series 2 Episode 4 "Fit Up"), played by Colin McFarlane. Maximus Fiticus is a fitness coach and former Olympian who is utterly obsessed with being fit.

Gesundheit (S.K.U.L. Associate and Pharmacist, Series 2 Episode 7 "The Cold War"), played by Darren Bouthworth. Gesundheit is a humble pharmacist who allies himself with The Grand Master and recreates a powerful super-flu from 1914. He is terrified of germs and can't stand going outside as he's constantly afraid that he'll catch something.

Nora Braithwaite (S.K.U.L. Associate and Nit Nurse, Series 2 Episode 8 "Nano Nits"). A villain working undercover as a nit nurse comes to S.K.U.L. with a way to create more villains to be S.K.U.L. agents. She releases 'nano nits' that invade minds open to suggestion and turn them into copied of infamous criminal masterminds. She planned to overthrow The Grand Master after her mission was complete, but was arrested by M.I.9.

Brian Gainsborough (S.K.U.L. Agent and Art Critic, Series 3 Episode 1 "Art Attacks"). An art critic who dislikes modern art, impersonates British modern artist Kranky and destroys famous monuments with corrosive spray paint to ensure that Britain's anti-S.K.U.L. treaty is never signed. He's later captured by M.I.9 and sentenced to community service restoring the destroyed monuments.

Agent X (S.K.U.L. Associate, Series 3 Episode 3 "Agent X"). Undercover as innocent young girl 'Della', is an agent who has never failed a mission and has never been seen. Hired by S.K.U.L. to retrieve Oscar's mole (which is actually a microchip filled with stolen M.I.9 files), she's later turned good by Oscar and names herself 'Sally' and is recruited by M.I.9.

Jade Dixon-Halliday (Rae Baker) is an M.I.9 double agent whose loyalty resides with S.K.U.L. She stole top secret M.I.9 files and hid them in a microchip inside a mole on her son Oscar's hand. Believed to be on M.I.9's side, she was revealed to be a traitor in "Operation Flopsy". She appeared again when she tricked M.I.9 into thinking that she was an undercover mole inside S.K.U.L. with intentions of discovering who the real mole was, but her plan was foiled. After eluding capture again, she appeared again in "Tim Brown's S.K.U.L. Days" when she revealed herself to Oscar and convinced him to join S.K.U.L. so that they could overthrow The Grand Master, but he double crossed her and The Grand Master, and while The Grand Master escaped, she was finally arrested and thrown into prison. Though she is never there for Oscar she genuinely seems to care for him and keeps insisting she wants them to be a 'family again'. In a world where Skul and MI9 didn't exist maybe they could have had a shot at happiness living as a normal family but circumstances and different alliances have forced them into bad situations to the point Oscar tries to avoid talking about his mother altogether.

Fake Doctor Wallis (S.K.U.L. agent, Series 3 Episode 4 "The Mind Machine"). A S.K.U.L. agent posing as a Cambridge scientist, he steals The Mind Machine and prepares to sell it to The Grand Master, along with information about M.I. High. He is later arrested and made to think that he is a goldfish before being sent back to S.K.U.L.

Venus Houston (S.K.U.L. agent and Astronaut, Series 3 Episode 13 "Moontaker"). A S.K.U.L. agent tasked with reactivating an abandoned missile defence system on the Moon for S.K.U.L.'s purposes. She's later arrested by M.I.9.

Walter Bailey (S.K.U.L. Cleaner, Series 4 Episode 4 "Mrs. King: License To Spy"). A cowardly S.K.U.L. cleaner who cleans out Flopsy's hutch. He sneaks into Saint Hope's and tries to prove to The Grand Master that the whole school is a secret M.I.9 training facility. He's found out and tricked by the agents and is ignored once again by The Grand Master who orders him to clean Flopsy's toilet.

Brie and Elmer Pantry (S.K.U.L. Agents, Series 4 Episode 5 "Don't Cook Now"). High ranking S.K.U.L. agents, they work undercover as a waitress and sous chef respectively at Blumenheck's restaurant stealing top secret bank codes from M.I.9 as they're generated. They are later arrested by M.I.9 and Brie gives M.I.9 access to a S.K.U.L. bank account that she used to repay the stolen money.

Toby Bleach (S.K.U.L. Agent and Archaeologist, Series 4 Episode 12 "SKULdiggery"). An American archaeologist assigned by S.K.U.L. to retrieve a long forgotten Druidic weapon that wiped out the entire Roman Ninth Legion. Has an irrational fear of getting dirty.

Theo Phantom (S.K.U.L. Hacker, Series 5 Episode 3 "Ghosts"). An expert hacker who destroys the world's first stable artificial intelligence, Bodlien. He inadvertently created the digital entity 'Crime' which was once a part of Bodlien with all knowledge of all crime fiction who then hacks into police and court records to become the most powerful being in the world. Crime incriminated Theo Phantom for hacking into the police records.

Egor (S.K.U.L. Associate, Series 5 Episode 4 "Total Eclipse"). An associate of Arthur Poopsberry, the creator of a hypnotic autosuggestion spiral that betrayed him and helped The Grand Master to start a war against Belgium in exchange for lots of money. He projected a spiral controlled by The Grand Master onto a solar eclipse that hypnotised thousands of people in Britain into doing The Grand Master's bidding (The Grand Master went to war with Belgium as Flopsy had fallen gravely ill after eating a dodgy Belgian waffle!).

Troy Greek (S.K.U.L. Agent, Series 5 Episode 6 "The Patient"). Believed to have defected from S.K.U.L. in order to give M.I.9 valuable intelligence, but was poisoned by S.K.U.L. ninjas and brought to Saint Hope's for safety. The ninjas tracked him down and supposedly finished him off before attempting to steal M.I.9's data. It was revealed that he had a tracking device inside him and he had in fact been revived by the ninjas so that they could escape with M.I.9's data as a part of an elaborate plot.

Vincent 'Vinnie' Argyle (S.K.U.L. Agent and Archaeologist, Series 5 Episode 7 "The Crystal of St. Helena"). Believed to be an eccentric archaeologist, he helped the agents track down a rare crystal that The Grand Master required for a super weapon. Succeeding in retrieving the crystal before S.K.U.L., Vinnie reveals that they were the S.K.U.L. team, before double crossing The Grand Master in hope to fund elaborate research projects to find lost treasures such as The Holy Grail, the lost city of Atlantis, the lost land of Lemuria and many others. He proposes that Rose joins him, but she instead arrests him and takes him back to M.I.9.

Agent Suki (S.K.U.L. Agent, Series 5 Episode 10 "Tim Brown's S.K.U.L. Days"), played by Adelayo Adedayo. Suki is a cold-hearted girl who deliberately dropped a USB flash drive containing information about the S.K.U.L Academy, which the agents find and Carrie interrogates Suki about it. She eventually gives in to Carrie after being tortured by being forced to listen to Mr. Flatley's terrible piano accordion playing.

Anita Blackwell (S.K.U.L. Academy Student, Series 5 Episode 10 "Tim Brown's S.K.U.L. Days). A vile pupil who is a school star, but is quickly overtaken by newcomer Tim Brown (Oscar in disguise). She becomes super jealous and when Oscar double crosses his mother and The Grand Master by giving them jet packs that don't work to allow them to be arrested, Anita hot wires The Grand Master's jet pack to allow him to escape. She's later arrested by M.I.9.

Quillian Pendrix (S.K.U.L. Associate and Puzzle Maker, Series 5 Episode 11 "The First to Crack"). An eccentric puzzle maker, he sides with The Grand Master and steals a deadly poison from M.I.9 and attempts to crack the impenetrable safe that it is contained in, in exchange for a deadly computer virus that will destroy every computer game console on Earth. Although he fails, he captures Rose and Oscar and makes a deal with The Grand Master to sell them, but is revealed by Carrie who leads the press down to corner him. He's later arrested by M.I.9.

Other Antagonists
Tony Frisco (Boy Band Crush's Manager, Series 1 Episode 2 "Eyes on Their Stars"), played by Steve Furst. Frisco is a has-been, a one-hit wonder. He was humiliated awfully on the TV real life show 'Pop Factor'. He is a bossy manager and doesn't really care about Crush.

Crush (Pop Band, Series 1 Episode 2 "Eyes on Their Stars"), played by Julian Gregory, Ryan Gregory and Eliot Gregory. A much loved boy band, Crush were managed by Tony Frisco. They wanted to sing their own lyrics but weren't allowed; Frisco made them sing a song which hypnotised the crowds to buy their single. Blane and Rose helped set them free from Frisco's clutches in "Eyes on Their Stars" with an 'antidote' song to reverse the hypnosis. Daisy is their 'biggest fan' and thinks they are gorgeous, but Blane disagrees and says that they are untalented. Their single has been downloaded over 40 million times. Crush member Arran hasn't spoken in public since May 12, 2001.

Brent Gilbert (Retired Tour Guide, Series 1 Episode 4 "The Power Thief"), played by Angus Barnett. Brent is a cowardly criminal with no experience, but is an expert on the Dark Stones. He attempted to send the world back into the Dark Ages by draining all the electricity. He was a tour guide at the Serinturk Museum.

The Worm (Expert Hacker, Series 1 Episode 5 "Nerd Alert" and Series 2 Episode 9 "The Others"), played by Steven Meiklejohn. The Worm is an unnamed immature child who likes to hack (or in his terms, "get free access") top secret sites. He has a big ego and is a big Mummy's boy. He attempted to crash SPARTA, the UK Defense Satellite. He was later released from prison and re-educated by M.I.9 and returns as a spy for M.I.9's second child team. It is also shown that he has a poorly disguised crush on Rose and later asks for her email, but only for if he had an important scientific question.

General Ryan Scarp (British Army General), played by Alex Ferns. Scarp is the British Army officer responsible for the security of teenage military inventor Dylan Towser. Believing that there would be no place for the army once world peace was achieved, he went insane and attempted to start a Third World War using real missiles substituted for the simulated weapons provided for the launch to demonstrate the success of Towser's invention, the Missile Disarmer. He destroyed the Missile Disarmer, but was later overcome, defeated and arrested.

Carla Terrini (AirOne Agent, Series 1 Episode 10 "The Fugitive"), played by Rebecca Palmer. Carla has won five Young Agent of the Year awards. She was trained by Lenny and owes everything she knows to him, but now works for a special force called AirOne. Although she is a dedicated agent, she seems to have forgotten her right from wrong and attempted to dissect a young boy who was the product of a foreign eugenics program. She stormed off in a huff when AirOne's authority over M.I.9 was invalidated after the team helped the boy escape. Although she wasn't a true villain, as she was the opposite force to the M.I High team, she can be considered as such.

Rebecca Palmer later returned to M.I High as a new character, M.I.9's Chief Agent Stella Knight, nearly six years later.

A.L.L.E.N. (Artificial Intelligence, Series 2 Episode 2 "You Can Call Me Al"). A.L.L.E.N. (the Automated Logistical Law-Enforcement Network) was a last ditch attempt for hapless M.I.9 inventor Quentin Blake to regain his reputation and job as Head of Security Technology. The agents were decommissioned for the day to allow for testing at Saint Hope's to see if A.L.L.E.N. was a success, but he went rogue and came to the conclusion that he could only control rule-breakers by imprisoning them. Daisy and Rose later broke into HQ and convinced him into shutting himself down as he referred to himself as a person and had in his eyes, broken the law.

Charlie 'Chuckers' Chuckworth (ex-M.I.9 Agent and Super Thief, Series 2 Episode 5 "Face Off"). An old teammate of Lenny's, he was revealed to be a coward and was thrown out of M.I.9 after he gave back a valuable microfilm back to the enemy whilst on a mission with Lenny many years ago. It was revealed that he gave the enemy a fake and the microfilm had plans on if for a new technology, an imaging mask that could disguise a person's face and voice to be anyone else's. He used the imaging mask along with his nephew Lewis to steal many valuable artworks from museums for profit, and framed grade-A schoolkids and Lenny. He was later arrested by M.I.9 and the imaging mask destroyed, with Lenny hoping that jail time would bring back the old Chuckers.

Lewis Chuckworth (Super Thief, Series 2 Episode 5 "Face Off" and Series 2 Episode 9 "The Others"). The nephew of ex-M.I.9 agent Charlie 'Chuckers' Chuckworth, Lewis helped his uncle commit daring robberies of museums for valuable works of art using an imaging mask that could disguise their face and voice to frame grade-A students and his uncle's old teammate Lenny. He grew tired of robbing and wanted his uncle to stop. He was later arrested by M.I.9 and the imaging mask destroyed. He was later released from prison and re-educated by M.I.9 and returns as a spy for M.I.9's second child team.

Mary Taylor (British MP, Series 2 Episode 6 "Big Sister"), played by Felicity Montagu. The crazed Minister of Schools who is convinced that she's allergic to children, plans to send them away to an Alcatraz-like island prison until they're eighteen under the guise of it being an adventure holiday program to help children learn manners. During a moment of madness in attempting to kidnap the children herself, Rose uses her own experiences of alienation to connect with Mary Taylor and convince her that she has no allergies and for her to stop her plans. She was last seen being hounded by the press. It is unknown if she resigned from her position.

James Blonde (ex-M.I.9 Field Agent, Series 2 Episode 9 "The Others"), played by Simon Farnaby. A crazed M.I.9 agent who objects the use of child spies to replace adult spies, he is tasked with conducting a test on the agents and new secondary team of The Worm, Lewis Chuckworth, and Violet Webb which he later corrupts to try to get the agents to fail. He gets so obsessed that he tricks The Worm into wiping the base's files which he had rigged to set off the self-destruct. After being saved by the agents, he's arrested by M.I.9.

Mr. B (Brother of football legend Ben Lacey, Series 2 Episode 10 "The Big Bling"). Also known as Reginald 'Reggie' Lacey, as the mistreated 'nerdy' brother of daft football legend Ben Lacey, he steals eight of the world's famous diamonds to create a high-power laser device that will allow him to destroy his brother's mansion and possessions. The last famous diamond left that Mr. B needs is the Koh-i-Noor diamond of the crown jewels, which was sent to Saint Hope's for safe keeping. He attempts to use the incomplete laser weapon to blast his way down to the underground base, but fails and is arrested by M.I.9.

Irena Ryfield (Jemma McKenzie Brown) is the daughter of Boris Ryfield, the creator of the X20 Spy Plane which has a cloaking device. She steals the plane her dad has been working on for the past ten years, simply because he does not pay her enough attention because of it. She puts it up for sale on the black market, and Blane poses as the son of an oil baron to buy the plane. Blane really fancies her, much to Daisy's annoyance. Irena finds out Blane isn't really an oil baron, just as he is about to buy the plane, so Blane has to stop her getting away with the money (almost crashing the plane in the process, and then running out of fuel). She's later sentenced to community service by M.I.9, being made to give flying lessons with her father accompanying her. She asks if Blane can come and help too, but Daisy prevents it from happening

Greenfinger (Environmentalist, Series 2 Episode 12 "Greenfinger"). Also known as Charlie Darwin, he created mutant plants to help him fight for the environment. An avid environmentalist, he and his environmentalist boss run a camp in Burnham Woods. He slowly loses control over the plants and they attack him, but with Blane's help, he defeats them. His boss is revealed to be a fraud and lives in a tent that's filled with modern technology, he also wanted to sell the woods to developers.

Reverend Isombarb Septimus Nye (Idealist and former member of the Asteroid Defence Program, Series 2 Episode 13 "Asteroid Attack"). Also known as Dr. VonQuark, he worked for years for the government's Asteroid Defence Program, but after failing to convince them that Asteroid K-13 will crash into the Earth, he abandoned his post and set up 'The Order of a New Gold Dawn'. After the government tried and failed to destroy the asteroid with a missile, they abandoned hope and moved to a secret bunker. After being tricked by the team that K-13 had impacted with Earth, he revealed the calculations to allow a missile to destroy the asteroid, which the team used to finally destroy the asteroid and save the Earth. But the Reverend had placed a magnetic lock on the bunker's door to keep the people inside trapped, after the team cracked the code, he was arrested by M.I.9.

Luke Withers (Super Thief, Series 3 Episode 2 "The Mole"). Was once partners with a criminal known as The Mole, who dug his way into high security vaults using The Mole Machine to steal their contents, and dug his associate out of jail when captured. Eventually, he betrayed him and went out on his own and began raiding banks. He was eventually arrested by M.I.9. The Mole Machine made a second appearance in "Doppelgängers" when Oscar, Rose and Carrie broke into an M.I.9 facility to save Frank.

Colt Winchester (Thief, Series 3 Episode 5 "Dark Star"). An old university colleague of Frank's who helped him create the Dark Star. Jealous that Frank got the science award instead of him, he attempted to steal it, but was stopped by Frank and jailed. He later breaks out and goes after Frank to steal the Dark Star again, but ultimately fails again after Frank, Oscar and Carrie stop him and his gang. It was revealed by Frank that his chosen name was actually a pun on his original name and home town: Colin from Winchester.

Dr Leonard Vince (Scientific Genius, Series 3 Episode 8 "The Think Tank"). Formerly an idiot for entering and invention competition with giant sticky back fridge notes that were larger than the fridges they were designed for, he became an overnight genius after he tricked the winner of the competition to test his invention The Think Tank, on himself. The Think Tank was designed to give one the brain power of another to boost their intelligence, but it left the subject a mindless vegetable. He then opened the National Academy of Brilliance in order to steal the brain power of promising young minds and become the smartest person in the world. After his plans were foiled by Oscar, Carrie and a daft Rose, he fell into a tub filled with the brain power of over 100 people and has been speaking gibberish ever since. His genius inventions were deemed useless as he never wrote down the plans as he was paranoid that someone would steal them.

Allanah Sucrose (Government Environment Advisor, Series 3 Episode 10 "The Glove"). A woman crazed with becoming the most powerful woman in the world, she stole the nation's power supply and attempted to steal The Cellatric Glove, a device that will restore the lost power. She even went so far as to trick an environmental expert into helping her steal the glove by saying that someone else would steal it. Her plans were eventually foiled, and it was revealed that she wore a wig. Mr. Flatley took a liking to her, but ran away in disgust after seeing her without her wig on.

Per Trollberger (Boldovian Secret Agent, Series 3 Episode 11 "The Visit"). Under the guise of being a gymnastics coach for the Boldovian national team, he came to Britain with the intentions of kidnapping the Prime Minister and breaking out The Boldovian Three, the most dangerous Boldovian secret agents. His plan briefly succeeded, but was foiled by M.I.9 and he along with The Boldovian Three were jailed once more, with the PM giving strict instructions for them to never be released under any circumstances.

Well Fit Jim (Gym Owner, Series 4 Episode 3 "Quakermass"). Presenting himself as a fitness fanatic and the owner of a number of gyms (Well Fit Jim's Gyms), he invested thousands of dollars in underwater real estate underneath the English Channel and caused numerous earthquakes to try and force the land above sea level, making the land worth millions and making him a millionaire. Just before he succeeded, he was stopped by the team and arrested. As Carrie's idol, she found it hard to find a criminal in him.

Andrea Ivanovic (Russian Scientist, Member of S.C.A.B., Series 4 Episode 7 "Doppelgängers"). A brilliant Russian scientist, she entered a relationship with Stark and began Operation Looking Glass to create highly powerful androids modeled after Rose, Oscar and Carrie. After earlier tests with rabbits went wrong, Stark shut the project down and dumped her, but Andrea craved revenge and ordered that the androids steal top secret M.I.9 files. She entered the files in an auction to the criminal underworld to become a billionaire and continue Operation Looking Glass, but was foiled by the agents, Frank and Stark.

Sydney Barbour (Professional Actress, Series 4 Episode 8 "High School Spy Movie"). The flawless muse for film director Lars von Tripod, she is actually over 70 years old and has stolen valuable relics to pay for full-body plastic surgery to return as a younger actress for von Tripod's films. After being stopped, she was arrested by M.I.9 and her latest theft returned to its rightful place. As Carrie's icon, she felt betrayed when she discovered that it was Sydney committing the robberies.

Terry Zucker (Vacuum Cleaner Inventor, Series 4 Episode 9 "Black Hole"). The creator of the thieving Zucker vacuums, he used them to steal people's valuable possessions from right under their noses, including a golden statue from the Prime Minister's residence at Number 10 Downing Street. Carrie brought a Zucker vacuum into HQ to give it a clean, but the Zucker stole top secret M.I.9 files instead. Zucker's latest vacuum, the Mega-Zucker was so powerful once accidentally switched on, it created a black hole, but was disabled by Oscar. The files were retrieved and Zucker jailed with all but one Zucker vacuum being destroyed, the last one being reprogrammed and sentenced to clean HQ for the next decade.

Dwayne Flatley (Animal Lover, Series 4 Episode 11 "Millionaire Flatley"). The founder of kitten foundation S.K.U.L. (Save Kittens with Unconditional Love), he threatened to blow up Saint Hope's unless Mr. Flatley turned down his million-dollar inheritance from his dead Great Aunt Jemima. He also sent threats to Mr. Flatley's relatives who would share the fortune between themselves, but after Mr. Flately was the only one to accept the fortune, he activated the bomb. After the bomb was stopped, he was arrested and jailed. It was revealed that the entire inheritance was worth a grand total of £5 exactly.

Saint Hope’s
Mr. Kenneth Flatley (Chris Stanton) is the headteacher of Saint Hope's and Saint Hearts, and is the only character to appear in all 7 series. He is easy going but has a determined streak and an obsession for getting things right. He really believes in Saint Hope's and its pupils. He has great patience and works long hours without complaining. Though there has been no improvement in school results, morale or truancy levels, Mr. Flatley's optimism remains undented. He was slightly jealous of Lenny, showing this by making him do menial jobs. However he seems to get on better with Frank, and uses a friendship with him to assist with escaping Mrs. King. Mr. Flatley is absolutely terrified by Mrs. King. "The Mole" reveals that Mr. Flatley is terrified of moles. He also seems to have a little crush on Miss Templeman as shown on "Spy Animals". He is usually quite weedy and pathetic, rather cowardly, but, manages to get on with kids in a lighthearted way. He also runs a Morris Dancing club after school.

Mrs. Hermione King (Channelle Owen) is the deputy head of St Hopes and St Hearts. Mrs. King does not like the way that the school is run, and believes that they should revert to traditional teaching methods, and is constantly pointing out how bad the school's exam results are. Mrs. King indicates to the Ofsted reporter that visits the school that she feels she should become headteacher, although the Ofsted reporter criticises her for not taking her job as part of a team. She is very strict and hates Mr. Flatley. She got a storyline towards the end of the show, where she found out about the M.I.High agents, but, they managed to erase her memory and later in the episode "Mrs. King: License to Spy" when the mindwipe started to fail, her memories got mixed up and she started to think that she was an agent; causing the kids a lot of trouble and making Frank uncomfortable because she constantly flirted with him.

Avril Franklin (Jenny Huxley Golden) is a student at St Hopes. A goth artist and activist, she is passionate about the environment, animal rights and human rights. She often criticises anything that could be exploitation, does not deal with "real issues" or encourages competition. She does not like the government and refuses to join M.I.9 in "The B Team" until she learns that Oscar is in danger. She has a crush on Oscar, which he tends to ignore. At the end of "The B Team" Oscar kisses her on the forehead, causing her to walk off blushing.

Davina Berry (Eliza Cummings-Cove) is the thick and ditsy one in the class. She only cares about what she looks like and has a fear of folk music which she overcomes in "The Mole". Davina is generally seen hanging around with Donovan, who she gets on with most of the time but occasionally bosses around, but in series 5 begins to show a close friendship with Avril, despite their differences. She joins Avril and Scoop to become a new spy in 'The B Team', using her expert makeup skills to help the team save the day. She is closest with Carrie out of the three main spies, whom she makes a special bond with in 'The Patient' when, on a night time trip to the loo, they both seemingly encounter 'The Grey Lady of St. Hopes'. This relationship is then shown again when Davina offers to take Carrie shopping and "sort out [her] wardrobe" at the end of 'The B Team'.

Donovan Butler (Joseph Cocklin) is a character quite similar to Davina, a young good looking boy who seems to be focused on fame and money. He is mainly seen hanging around with Davina and seems to have a fear of corduroy which he overcomes as shown in "The Mole", Donovan was also added into the series at season 3, he is seen most of the time hanging around with Davina. In series 4 stops wearing posh clothes and starts to wear trendier clothes e.g. trainers, he also has his ear pierced and he also has spiked up hair. Donovan and Davina are like best friends. He is about as dumb as Davina, but she talks more, so says more stupid things.

Scoop Doggy (Sam Melvin), real name Timothy Hinklebottom, is a student at St Hopes. He is generally shown to be quite thickheaded, however as revealed in "The B Team" he is quite clever and has the potential of a spy (though this is mainly thanks to 'Smart-Ease'). Rose Gupta saved Scoop's life once in "The New Grand Master", and he was determined to find the mystery girl who saved his life. Carrie teases him a lot because of his stupidity "act" as Rose put it. He temporarily found out about Rose's spy status in "The B Team", and in the same episode realised she was the girl who saved his life (though his memory of it was erased along with Avril's and Davina's). In "The Gran Master" he tries to ask Rose to the disco, but is too afraid to do so, which shows that he may still subconsciously know who she is. He is also secretly a talented artist, which is found out in "The New Grand Master".

Ms Helen Templeman (Jane Cameron) was a teacher at St Hopes and Blane, Rose and Daisy's form teacher. Luckily for the school, but unluckily for the spy team, their form teacher is a young, sensitive, ambitious teacher. She secretly fancies Lenny but is too shy to tell him. However, in "Spy Animals", she nearly reveals her secret while given a truth serum. She also reveals that Mr. Flatley disgusts her because he is such a whiny pathetic man. Mechanics is one of her hobbies.

Stewart Critchley (Scott Gibbins) is Blane's best friend and side-kick, he believes in UFOs and the supernatural. His favourite TV programme is Star Trek and he also runs the school radio club. Stewart knows nothing about Blane being a spy but Blane has been close to telling him a few times. However Stewart gets suspicious how Blane keeps disappearing all the time. Stewart has feelings for Daisy, but indicates he likes Rose more. Stewart has earned his Green Blue Peter Badge and can be seen wearing it on his coat and school uniform.

Fifty Pence (Sam Ardley), real name Julian Hamley, is the school bully at St Hopes. He always gets bad grades at school and thinks he is a great rapper. He has won a brave kid award. In "Spy Animals" it's revealed his bullying is the result of him overcompensating for his feminine side and that he always wanted to be a ballerina. The name "Fifty Pence" is  a parody of the American rap musician Curtis James Jackson III who uses the stage name 50 Cent.

Zara (Bethany Denville) is friends with Daisy, Kaleigh and Letitia, the popular girls in school. She is constantly confused and seems to be a bit ditzy but she doesn't mind, as long as her clothes are in season and she is looking fashionable. She is easily told what to do by Kaleigh or Letitia.

Kaleigh (Leonie Boyd) is the tough ring-leader of the class gang, and has a 'couldn't care less' attitude. She is friends with Daisy and Zara, and only cares about her hair and her nails. She is rather overweight. She can be quite bossy and makes fun of Rose.

Letitia (Princess Webb) replaces Kaleigh in series two. She is friends with Daisy and Zara.

Saint Heart's 
Mr. Kenneth Flatley (Chris Stanton) is the new headteacher of Saint Heart's that M.I.9 has arranged.
Roland 'Big Roly' Donaldson (Paul Bamford)

Melissa Allbright (Tallulah Greive) It is very obvious that Melissa fancies Dan and there are only a couple of episodes that show this but they are very obvious examples. Episodes include: The Dark Wizard (Series 6 Episode 9) and The Germinator (Series 6 Episode 8)

Brian 'Byron' Ditchwater (Josh Haynes)

Mr. McNab (Brian McCardie) Is a rather strict deputy head. He is the opposite of Mr Flatley, and they often argue. He leaves at the end of Series 6 for unknown reasons.

Mrs. King joined Saint Heart's in Series 7, taking over the teaching role from Mr. McNab. She is also Aneisha's aunt.

M.I.9
Head of M.I.9 (Victoria Wicks (Series 1-2), Adjoa Andoh (Series 3-5)) is the spy in charge of M.I.9. She is talking to Lenny in "The Big Freeze" saying that she has had to cancel her barbecue. She later appears in "Spy Animals" being at M.I.9 in the bugged meeting room. In "Forever Young" she talks to Lenny saying they need results. However, by the Crimewave episode, the Head of M.I.9 was replaced by another woman. The same Head of M.I.9 appeared in more episodes in Series 3 onwards.

Chief Agent Stark (Jonathan Rhodes) is the chief agent of M.I.9. Cocky and arrogant, his plans  he doesn't approve of Frank London and his M.I. High team and turns his nose up at Maurice Hutchinson as well. The Head of M.I.9 gets cross with him for his idiocy and rudeness in episode 5 and 6 of series 4. He has a long run of bad luck whenever the M.I. High agents are involved, and they usually make him look like an idiot, which adds to his hatred of them. He is shown after "Run Carrie, Run!" to be a competent enough agent, but, very bad under pressure.

Maurice Hutchinson (Richard Goulding) is the M.I.9 animal expert. He somewhat resembles a rabbit because he has a nose which can't stop twitching and has small buck teeth. Chief Agent Stark is not very pleased that M.I.9 employed him. He was in charge of using animals to do surveillance work, such as training squirrels to chew through wires and steal USB sticks.

Smart-Ease Presenter (George Murphy) is the presenter of a 1950s M.I.9 training film documenting 'Smart-Ease', a substance which allows normal people to super speed learn new skills. Unfortunately the effects wear off after 24 hours.

Stella Knight (Rebecca Palmer) is the strict chief agent of M.I.9. she and Frank are, and have been romantically involved. She is a far better chief agent than Stark. It was revealed that she was part of The League of Mata Hari and was later arrested. It turned out that she was innocent and is later reinstated in MI9.

Hamish Campbell (Finn Den Hertog) was the head of M.I.9 Stationary. He was a respected agent that investigated the League of Mata Hari but was then demoted due to this investigation. At the end of the episode The League of Mata Hari, he is made the new Head of M.I. 9. In the 12th episode of series 7 he is discovered to be a member of KORTEX (a branch of KORPS).

Mike Stern (Liam Brennan) was the Director General of M.I.9 Security he looked after the security of M.I.9 but was part of the League of Mata Hari and was eventually arrested.

Army
Kyle Whittaker (Henry Lloyd-Hughes) is Blane's older brother by twelve years. He is a commando in the British Army. Kyle was almost called into a Special Forces raid on The Worm's house which could have ended in disaster if Blane, Rose and Daisy hadn't dealt with the Worm first.

Dylan Towser (Louis Marlow) is a very rich and intelligent boy genius who needs to use a wheelchair. He is working for the British Army to develop a Missile Disarmer. His Head of Security was General Ryan Scarp, who turned out to be a traitor. He was kidnapped by Scarp who wanted to start a war with the missiles provided for the launch. His first Missile Disarmer was destroyed by Scarp, but he managed to build another just in time to stop the real missiles with which Scarp planned to start World War III.

Sergeant Rayner (Tameka Empson) is a British Army sergeant and subordinate of General Ryan Scarp. She does not tolerate incompetence, whingers or weaknesses of any other sort. But although she might be loud and scary, deep down, she has a good heart. Helping the agents put a stop to Scarp's plan.

Lu (Tai-Li Lee): The product of a foreign eugenics program, Lu appears to be an ordinary-looking Chinese boy selected to be the test-pilot for a space probe. His body has been specially designed to withstand the g-forces involved in air flight. An expert in science, Lu finds a friend in Rose.

Government
Prime Minister (Robert Llewellyn) was the leader of the UK from 2001-2008. He was kidnapped and cloned by the Guinea Pig in an attempt to start a war with Europe. He was also talking to the Space Centre Director and Lenny Bicknall on the telephone in "Nerd Alert". He was present during the Ryfield plane crisis and the asteroid emergency when he and his advisors, ministers, the Royal Family and other VIP's were relocated to a safety bunker. By 2009, he had been replaced by Planer. Term of Office: 2001–2008.

Prime Minister (Nigel Planer) was the leader of the UK during "The Visit". He has a daughter named Chiante-Marie, who was a poor gymnast. While his daughter was performing at St. Hopes, the PM was kidnapped by Boldovian criminals and forced to release the three most dangerous Boldovian criminals. MI9 intervened and PM Planer was saved.

Roger Powel (Simon Kunz) is Head of Research at the Weather Bureau. He attempted to pass Sonya Frost's weather machine as his own. He has no idea of the existence of S.K.U.L. He only had one A-level and he came clean by telling the public that Sonya invented the Weather Machine. After this he was sacked at the Weather Bureau.

Dr. Simon Grabworst (Michael Webber) is the Chief Scientist at the National Organisation for Scientific Exploration – N.O.S.E. for short. He was affected by the water contaminated by Vanessa Zietgeist's regression formula, turning his mind into that of a baby. Even as a baby he attempted to tell the M.I.9 agents about how to synthesise the antidote by drawing pictographs. An antidote developed by Rose restored both him and the whole of the affected Saint Hope's populace to normal.

Leo Taybridge (Tim Downie) is a government advisor to Llyewellyn's Prime Minister and SKUL informant.

Other
Konnie Huq (BBC Presenter) was a real-life Blue Peter presenter. She knows about climate change and global warming. The Grand Master is her biggest fan.

Mr. Gupta (Quill Roberts) is Rose's pushy father. He has high hopes for her and if she gets anything below an 'A' grade he is not happy. He wants to send her to posh school Montsignor Academy until Lenny convinces him that Saint Hope's is as hi-tech as it gets.

Linus Millar (Mark Powley) is Daisy's absent father. Although it's not clear what he does for a living but he is shown to be a very well-connected person, which includes the Queen. He is the chairman of the Serinturk Museum board of trustees. Mark Powley is Bel Powley's father in real life.

Lena Larsson (Kristina Godwin) is Carrie's gymnastics friend from Boldovia. She is very kind and caring but little known to Carrie she works for the Boldovian government. She explains to Carrie in a letter that the Boldovian government threatened to kidnap her parents.

M.I. High
M.I. High